The Fat Boy Chronicles is a film about Jimmy Winterpock, an obese high-school student who deals with bullying and trying to lose weight. The film is inspired by a true story about an obese 9th grader in Cincinnati and a novel and film were released in 2010 as a major motion picture, and was later released on Netflix. The movie received mixed reviews, with users on Rotten Tomatoes giving the movie a 49% "Rotten" rating.

Plot
Jimmy Winterpock always gets teased by the football team for being overweight at 188 pounds and only 5 ft 5. As a school assignment he writes about it in his journal. He soon meets a girl named Sable Moore who, as the story goes on, Jimmy learns that she cuts herself. After making quick friends, they start to go to church together. Eventually, Jimmy begins jogging with his father, with a goal to lose 38 pounds. Paul Grove, Jimmy's friend was the one who told him to do this. Paul talks Jimmy into sneaking out to a party. Later Paul's father commits suicide. Paul runs away and gets injured in an accident in Colorado. Jimmy tutors Robb Thurman, who is the football captain. Robb, because of this, tells his teammates not to harass Jimmy any more, as they become friends.

Characters
 Jimmy Winterpock (Christopher Rivera) - A normally depressed boy outside of home and church, he is the protagonist. As the main character of the book and film, Jimmy tries to lose weight.
 Paul Grove (Chris Bert) - Jimmy's best friend a troubled teen with drug addict parents, he struggles to find meaning in his life.
 Sable Moore (Kelly Washington) -  Jimmy's love interest and later girlfriend, she has mental issues and cuts herself to heal her mental scars.
 Robb Thuman (Cole Carson) - A high school quarterback for the team, as well as a bully who, after a few tutoring sessions with Jimmy, starts to protect him.
 Allen Winterpock (Bill Murphey) - Jimmy's father who is also somewhat overweight, who runs with him during their jogs.
 Marianne Winterpock (Sylvia Castro Galan) - Jimmy's mother.
 Dr. Jeffords (Ron Lester) - The doctor that examined Jimmy.
 Nate Hammer (Benjamin Davis) - A punk teen who has bullied Jimmy since middle school.
 Mr. Grove (Robert Pralgo)
 Ms. Pope (Sarah Cooper) - Jimmy’s hot high school English teacher. She assigns Jimmy to write 3 half pages a day in his journal. This journal is a driving point of the film.
 Whitney Elliot (Erin Áine) - A popular cheerleader who despite pretending to be Jimmy’s friend is another bully.
 Allen Zuckerman (Jacob Boyd) - Another victim of bullying at Jimmy’s school. After discovering they ride the same bus, Jimmy and Allen become friends.

References

External links
  
 

2010 films
American drama films
Films about obesity
2010s English-language films
2010s American films